Alcimus was a high priest in Jerusalem in the 2nd century BC.

Alcimus may also refer to:

Alcimus (fly), a genus of robber flies in the family Asilidae
Alcimus (mythology), several figures in Greek mythology
Alcimus (rhetorician), 3rd-century BC Greek rhetorician
Alcimus Alethius, 4th-century Latin poet
Avitus of Vienne, 6th-century bishop, also known as Saint Alcimus Ecdicius Avitus

See also
 Alkimos (disambiguation)